June Lake is a lake on Vancouver Island north of Great Central Lake and north east of Oshinow Lake.

References

Alberni Valley
Lakes of Vancouver Island
Strathcona Provincial Park
Clayoquot Land District